Qaleh-ye Chah Kutah (also Romanized as Qal‘eh-ye Chāh Kūtāh; also known as Qal‘eh-ye Aḩmadkhān) is a village in Howmeh Rural District, in the Central District of Bushehr County, Bushehr Province, Iran. At the 2006 census, its population was 347, in 79 families.

References 

Populated places in Bushehr County